Montivipera is a genus of vipers. Like all other vipers, they are venomous.

Species
 Montivipera albizona (Nilson, Andrén, and Flärdh, 1990)
 Montivipera bornmuelleri (Werner, 1898)
 Montivipera bulgardaghica (Nilson & Andrén, 1985)
 Montivipera kuhrangica (Rajabizadeh, Nilson, & Kami, 2011)
 Montivipera latifii (Mertens, Darevsky, & Klemmer, 1967)
 Montivipera raddei (Boettger, 1890)
 Montivipera wagneri (Nilson & Andrén, 1984)
 Montivipera xanthina (Gray, 1849)

References

 
Snake genera